Gerry Ford (born 4 November 1957) is a London-based American businessman and the Chief Executive of Caffè Nero, the UK's third-largest coffee chain. In 2020 Ford said that he had spent 70% of his life in Europe, and that this is where he developed a passion for and understanding of coffee and coffee houses.

Early life
Gerry Ford is the son of an American university Professor of Education. He accompanied his father on sabbaticals to European countries. He grew up in Silicon Valley.

Ford first attended Stanford University, where he studied Politics and International Relations.  As well as a Master of Arts in Law and Diplomacy from the Fletcher School of Law and Diplomacy at Tufts University.

Career
His first job was as a financial analyst for Hewlett-Packard. He cites Bill Hewlett and Dave Packard as role models.

He came to work in the UK for Apax Partners, a private equity company, where he stayed for three years.

He co-founded Paladin Partners, an equity company, in 1991.

Caffè Nero
Caffè Nero had been established as an Italian coffee concept in South Kensington in 1990 by Ian Semp; the company with five central London branches was sold to Paladin in 1997.

Paladin Partners established Caffè Nero in 1997 in South Kensington, with five branches. At the time most people drank coffee from instant coffee bought in the supermarket. Now the company has around 700 establishments in the UK. The company format was refined over the first eighteen months, and the eighth version of the format is what is now known today.

In March 2001 the company joined the London Stock Exchange. He took the company off the stock exchange in 2007. The company's headquarters are in Covent Garden. Since 2007 Cafe Nero has paid no tax in the United Kingdom despite 2019 profits of £23 million.

Personal life
Ford lives in Kensington. He is married to Amanda and has two sons.

References

External links
 Company history

1957 births
American chief executives of food industry companies
American food company founders
American retail chief executives
Apax Partners
Businesspeople in coffee
INSEAD alumni
People from the Royal Borough of Kensington and Chelsea
People from San Jose, California
Stanford University alumni
Living people